Apatetris mirabella is a moth of the family Gelechiidae. It was described by Otto Staudinger in 1880. It is found in Asia Minor.

The wingspan is about 13 mm. The forewings are white and yellow, with numerous black scales. The hindwings are white, sprinkled with black scales.

References

Moths described in 1880
Apatetris
Moths of Asia